Christian Garín was the defending champion but lost in the second round to Gastão Elias.

Gerald Melzer won the title after defeating Jozef Kovalík 7–5, 7–6(7–4) in the final.

Seeds

Draw

Finals

Top half

Bottom half

References
Main Draw
Qualifying Draw

Lima Challenger - Singles
2017 Singles